The Shan State Communist Party (SSCP) was a communist party in Shan State, Burma (present-day Myanmar). The party was founded in 1956 by Moh Heng, a commander of the Communist Party of Burma in Lawksawk, in protest of a decision by the CPB leadership to reject the creation of a separate party committee for Shan State.

The party leadership consisted of Bo Hla Min (chairman), Bo Min Thaung (politburo member), Bo Tun Lin (politburo member), Bo Moe Hein (politburo member), Saw Lwin (regional committee member), Ba Din (regional committee member), Ohn Pwint (regional committee member) and Hlaw Ywet Kan (regional committee member).

On 10 May 1958, 251 armed fighters and 150 other party members surrendered to the government.

References

1956 establishments in Burma
1958 disestablishments in Burma
Banned communist parties
Communist parties in Myanmar
Defunct communist militant groups
Defunct communist parties
Defunct political parties in Myanmar
Political parties disestablished in 1958
Political parties established in 1956
Rebel groups in Myanmar
Shan militia groups